Kidomole is a town in eastern Tanzania, lying on the coastal plain.  Rusako is a township nearby.

Transport 

Kidomole has a station on the Tanzanian Railways.  In October 2007, it was proposed to build a branch railway from Bagamoyo on the coast to this station.

See also 

 Transport in Tanzania
 Railway stations in Tanzania

References 

Populated places in Pwani Region